Roger Cotte, (1921 in Clamart – 1999) was a 20th-century French recorder player and musicologist.

Career 
Cotte studied music at the Conservatoire de Paris with Gaston Crunelle from 1940 to 1948. He created and directed since 1953 the Group of Ancient Instruments of Paris. In 1961, he obtained a Ph.D. in musicology from the Sorbonne, where he directed the musicology laboratory. He taught flute at the Schola Cantorum de Paris. He signed a few film music (Justine de Sade by Claude Pierson). From 1984 to 1992, he taught at the State University of Sao Paulo, Brazil, where he founded an early music group. He published La musique maçonnique et ses musiciens, Musique et symbolisme and a notebook of masonic songs.

His musical research has focused on Jean-Jacques Rousseau and Masonic music in Mozart, Beethoven, Johann Nepomuk Hummel.

Publications 
1958: Méthode complète de flûte à bec (ou flûte douce), Paris
1959: Encyclopédie des grands compositeurs, Paris
1961: Compositeurs français émigrés en Suède, thèse de doctorat, Paris
1973: Précis d'organologie, in: L'éducation musicale
1974: La musique maçonnique et ses musiciens, Paris
 Les textes de Voltaire mis en musique
1976: Jean-Jacques Rousseau musicien on the site of the BNF

References

External links 
  Roger Cotte, flûte on Musique classique forum
  Roger Cotte,La Musique maçonnique et ses musiciens.1975 (compte rendu) on Persée
 Roger Cotte discography on Discogs
 Roger Cotte A ARTE DA FLAUTA LA GUERRE on YouTube

1921 births
1999 deaths
French classical flautists
French recorder players
20th-century French musicologists
Conservatoire de Paris alumni
People from Clamart
20th-century classical musicians
20th-century flautists